Candyman 3: Day of the Dead (sometimes titled just  Candyman: Day of the Dead) is a 1999 American supernatural slasher film directed by Turi Meyer and starring Tony Todd and Donna D'Errico. It is the third installment in the Candyman series, and 
a direct sequel to the 1995 film Candyman: Farewell to the Flesh. Its plot follows Caroline, the daughter of Annie Tarrant and a descendant of the Candyman, the powerful spirit of the murdered son of a slave who kills those who invoked him, who finds herself targeted by him on the eve of the Day of the Dead.

Unlike the first two installments, the film did not get a theatrical release and was instead released direct-to-video on July 9, 1999. It was followed by a fourth film in 2021, titled Candyman, a prequel to Day of the Dead and a direct sequel to the original 1992 film which returns the storyline to Chicago, Illinois.

Plot
In 2020, twenty-five years after the events of the second film in 1995, a Candyman-themed gallery event hosted by artist Miguel Velasco in Los Angeles is attended by Caroline McKeever, daughter of Annie Tarrant and Paul McKeever from the second film and a direct descendant of the Candyman. Caroline summons the Candyman by saying his name five times in a mirror. Shortly afterwards, the Candyman kills Miguel and his lover Lena with his hooked hand.

Miguel's gallery is soon broken into by a local gang who steals the Candyman's paintings. Caroline talks with her roommate Tamara about the Candyman. It is revealed via flashback that the Candyman killed Caroline's dementia-ridden mother while she was taking a bath by slitting her throat with his hook. Annie summoned him and her death was believed to be suicide. A couple hours beforehand when last seeing her mother alive, Annie had told Caroline to 'destroy the myth'.

The murders are pinned on David de la Paz, a friend of Miguel's who soon gets acquainted with Caroline. After envisioning the Candyman and the ghost of her mother in a diner bathroom, she comes clean with David about her history. He takes her to see his grandmother, a psychic healer, who informs Caroline that she must destroy the good part of the Candyman in order to eliminate the evil. She shows Caroline visions that the good part of the Candyman lies within his paintings. Afterwards, the Candyman kidnaps David and keeps him stored in an unknown building swinging from hooks pierced into his back.

After the Candyman kills Caroline's roommate Tamara, Caroline is taken in for questioning. A seasoned police detective named L.V. Sacco is murdered by the Candyman while Caroline is in the car, which both brings her heat from the local authorities and earns her hate from Sacco's partner Lt. Det. Samuel Deacon Kraft, who had no intention of bringing her in alive. When Caroline goes to an abandoned building to retrieve the paintings from the gang who stole them from Miguel's gallery, she is captured by them and knocked out. She awakens tied to a chair and gagged. The gang summons the Candyman in the hopes of sacrificing Caroline but the Candyman kills the entire gang instead.

Caroline explores the building and finds David alive, but injured. The Candyman suddenly appears, and attempts to convince her to give her life to him. However, Caroline destroys a portrait of him with a hook, which causes a similar wound to appear on him. She slips and causes a candle to light the painting on fire, causing the Candyman to burst into flames. Caroline frees David, but is attacked by Det. Kraft, who tries to kill her with a hook. He is shot in the back of the head by Det. Jamal Matthews, who was following Kraft. Before he dies, Kraft gasps out "Candyman”. Caroline remembers her mother's advice to 'destroy the myth', and tells Matthews that Kraft was the Candyman this whole time.

After the news is released that Kraft was the Candyman, Caroline states, "There was no such thing as the Candyman" in front of a mirror to ensure he is dead. The Candyman's hook bursts through the mirror, but is then revealed to be just a nightmare. Caroline has a picnic with David and his daughter Cristina in front of Annie's grave as the Day of the Dead celebrations continue. She is finally happy, and is convinced the Candyman no longer exists.

Cast

Production
Filming took place in Boyle Heights, Eastside Los Angeles.

Critical response

On Rotten Tomatoes the film holds an 7% approval rating based on 14 reviews, with an average score of 3.40/10.

In 2008, Tony Todd admitted he considers Day of the Dead a poor entry in the Candyman series during one of Fangoria'''s Weekend of Horrors conventions.

Sequel
Cancelled fourth film
In the 2004 interview for Fangoria, Tony Todd said that a fourth Candyman film is being prepared and is supposed to have a $25 million budget. Todd and Clive Barker discussed storyboarding ideas during the crew's meetings. The sequel was meant to be Winter-set, with action taking place in a New England woman's college. It was cancelled most likely because of the problems with "determining who owns the Candyman franchise".

Deon Taylor was linked to the project at one point, according to Todd. In the interview with Bloody Disgusting Todd elaborated:

"(...) I had an idea that they liked, initially. It was going to take place in New England during a snow storm, because I just had this image of Candyman in a blizzard. Because I'm from New England, and I knew the power of having that mythic character in a snowstorm being undeterred by the elements. We had gone so far as to establish him as a professor at a girls' college."

Candyman (2021)

In September 2018, it was announced that Jordan Peele was in talks to produce a sequel through his Monkeypaw Productions which Todd stated in a 2018 interview with Nightmare on Film Street, "I would rather have him do it with someone with intelligence who was going to be thoughtful and dig into the whole racial makeup of who the Candyman was and why he existed in the first place." In November 2018, it was confirmed that Peele would produce the film with Universal and MGM and would partner with Win Rosenfeld to co-produce the film while Nia DaCosta signed on as director. The film would take place back in the new gentrified Cabrini Green where the old housing projects development stood in Chicago once. The filming was due to commence in the spring of 2019.

In January 2019, it was reported that Lakeith Stanfield would possibly star in the film as an older version of Anthony McCoy who took an interest on by seeking the legend of the Candyman which was similar to Helen Lyle's character that was played by Virginia Madsen. In February 2019, Yahya Abdul-Mateen II was in talks to play McCoy. He was initially misreported as being in talks to portray the titular character. In response to the news, Todd offered his blessings over Twitter by stating: "Cheers to the Candyman who was a wonderful character that I lived with for 25 years. He brought grace and glory and a beautiful boatload of friends and family. I am honored that the spirit of Daniel Robitaille and Cabrini Green rose again. Truth to power! Blessings to the cast and the crew". However, it was ultimately announced that Todd would reprise his role. The film was released on August 27, 2021.

References

Sources

 

External links
 
 Original script for Candyman: Day of the Dead''

1999 direct-to-video films
1999 films
1999 horror films
1990s slasher films
African-American horror films
Candyman 3
American supernatural horror films
Artisan Entertainment films
Candyman (film series)
Direct-to-video horror films
Direct-to-video sequel films
Films based on works by Clive Barker
Films set in 2020
Films set in the 2020s
Films set in Los Angeles
Films shot in Los Angeles
1990s English-language films
1990s American films